Michael Anthony Halliday (born January 22, 2003) is an American professional soccer player who plays as a defender for Major League Soccer club Orlando City.

Club career

Orlando City
Halliday joined the Orlando City Development Academy in 2016, playing 90 games from under-16 up to under-19 level in four seasons. In March 2020 he signed an academy contract with Orlando City B, the club's USL League One affiliate, ahead of the 2020 season. In July 2020, Halliday signed an MLS homegrown contract. He remained with OCB for the season, making his debut in the season opener, a 2–0 defeat to Tormenta FC on August 1. On May 29, 2021, Halliday may his senior Orlando City debut starting in a 2–1 defeat to New York Red Bulls. In doing so he became Orlando City's youngest first team player at 18 years, 127 days, beating Tommy Redding's record set in August 2015 by 70 days.

Career statistics

Club

Honors
Orlando City
U.S. Open Cup: 2022

United States U20
CONCACAF U-20 Championship: 2022

References

External links
Michael Halliday at Orlando City

2003 births
Living people
Orlando City B players
Orlando City SC players
USL League One players
Major League Soccer players
MLS Next Pro players
American soccer players
Soccer players from Orlando, Florida
Association football defenders
Homegrown Players (MLS)
United States men's under-20 international soccer players